The Men's Individual Road Race of the 1965 UCI Road World Championships cycling event took place on 5 September in San Sebastián, Basque Country, Spain.

Final classification
Source:

References

Men's road race
UCI Road World Championships – Men's road race
1965 Super Prestige Pernod